The Europe/Africa Zone was one of three zones of regional competition in the 2006 Fed Cup.

Group I
Venue: TC Lokomotiv, Plovdiv, Bulgaria (outdoor clay) 
Dates: 17–22 April

The seventeen teams were divided into three pools of four teams and one pool of five. The top teams of each pool played-off against each other to decide which two nations progress to World Group II Play-offs. The four nations coming last played-off against each other to decide which teams are relegated to Group II for 2006.

Pools

Play-offs

  and  advanced to the 2006 World Group II Play-offs.

Group II
Venue: Club Ali Bey, Manavgat, Antalya, Turkey (outdoor clay) 
Dates: 26–29 April

The seven teams were divided into one pool of three teams and one pool of four. The top two teams of each pool played-off against each other to decide which two nations progress to Group I for 2007. The four nations coming third in each pool then played-off to determine which team would join the fourth-placed team from the four-team pool in being relegated down to Group III for 2007.

Pools

Play-offs

  and  advanced to Group I for 2007.

Group III
Venue: Club Ali Bey, Manavgat, Antalya, Turkey (outdoor clay) 
Dates: 26–29 April

The eleven teams were divided into one pool of five teams and one pool of six. The top two teams of each pool played-off against each other to decide which two nations progress to Group II for 2007.

Pools

  and  advanced to Group II for 2007.

See also
Fed Cup structure

References

 Fed Cup Profile, Bulgaria
 Fed Cup Profile, South Africa
 Fed Cup Profile, Hungary
 Fed Cup Profile, Sweden
 Fed Cup Profile, Luxembourg
 Fed Cup Profile, Netherlands
 Fed Cup Profile, South Africa
 Fed Cup Profile, Serbia and Montenegro
 Fed Cup Profile, Slovakia
 Fed Cup Profile, Denmark
 Fed Cup Profile, Ukraine
 Fed Cup Profile, Romania
 Fed Cup Profile, Belarus
 Fed Cup Profile, Estonia
 Fed Cup Profile, Sweden
 Fed Cup Profile, Latvia
 Fed Cup Profile, Greece
 Fed Cup Profile, Poland
 Fed Cup Profile, Lithuania
 Fed Cup Profile, Ireland
 Fed Cup Profile, Iceland
 Fed Cup Profile, Turkey
 Fed Cup Profile, Egypt
 Fed Cup Profile, Azerbaijan
 Fed Cup Profile, Bosnia and Herzegovina
 Fed Cup Profile, Namibia
 Fed Cup Profile, Moldova
 Fed Cup Profile, Norway
 Fed Cup Profile, Botswana

External links
 Fed Cup website

 
Europe Africa
Sport in Plovdiv
Tennis tournaments in Bulgaria
Sport in Antalya
21st century in Antalya
Tennis tournaments in Turkey
2006 in Turkish tennis
2006 in Bulgarian tennis